Bródno is a station on the north-eastern part of Line M2 of the Warsaw Metro. It is located in the vicinity of Kondratowicza, Rembielińska and Bazyliańska streets. The station was opened on 28 September 2022.

Description 

The construction of the station began in 2019.

The planned opening of the station is in 2022.

The station was opened for passenger services on 28 September 2022.

References 

Railway stations in Poland opened in 2022
Line 2 (Warsaw Metro) stations